Principal Upanishads, also known as Mukhya Upanishads, are the most ancient and widely studied Upanishads of Hinduism. Composed between 800 BCE to the start of common era, these texts are connected to the Vedic tradition.

Content
The Principal Upanishads, which were composed probably between 600 and 300 BCE, constitute the concluding portion of the Veda. According to most Hinduism traditions, ten Upanishads are considered as Principal Upanishads, but some scholars now are including ,  and  into the list. The founders of the major schools of Vedanta, viz, Adi Shankara and Madhvacharya wrote  (commentaries) on these ten Principal Upanishads. Even though Ramanuja did not write individual commentaries on Principal Upanishads, he quoted many hundreds of quotations from Upanishads in his Sri Bhasya. In the Ramanuja lineage, one of his followers, Rangaramanuja, wrote commentaries on almost all of the Principal Upanishads around the 1600s.

The ten Principal Upanishads are:

 (IsUp), Yajurveda
 (KeUp), Samaveda  
 (KaUp), Yajurveda 
 (PrUp), Atharvaveda 
 (MuUp), Atharvaveda
 (MaUp), Atharvaveda 
 (TaiUp), Yajurveda 
, (AiUp), Rigveda
 (ChhUp),  Samaveda 
 (BṛUp), Yajurveda
The Principal Upanishads are accepted as śruti by all Hindus, or the most important scriptures of Hinduism. The Principal Upanishads are separated into three categories: prose, verse, and prose (classical Sanskrit).

Translations and works
Here is a list of works on the Upanishads:

References

External links
 Holybooks.com has a book containing the 10 principal Upanishads here: https://holybooks-lichtenbergpress.netdna-ssl.com/wp-content/uploads/The-Ten-Principal-Upanishads.pdf

Upanishads